Satya Prakash Srivastav (25 December 1963 – 21 September 2022), known professionally as Raju Srivastav and often credited as Gajodhar, was an Indian comedian, actor and politician. He was born in Kanpur, Uttar Pradesh, and moved to Mumbai in the 1980s to work in the Hindi film industry. He acted in Baazigar, Bombay to Goa, Aamdani Atthanni Kharcha Rupaiya among others. He contested in the comedy show The Great Indian Laughter Challenge and became the runner-up. He won the title of "The King of Comedy" in its spin-off show The Great Indian Laughter Challenge – Champions. He did many stand-up comedy live shows.

He had been a member of the Bharatiya Janata Party since 2014.

Early life 
He was born in 1963 in Kanpur city in the state of Uttar Pradesh in a Kayastha family. His father Ramesh Srivastav was a poet. In his childhood, Srivastav liked to mimic film stars including Amitabh Bachchan.

Career
In 1980s he moved to Mumbai, and started his career by doing small roles in Bollywood films. He had a part in the Rajshri Productions movie Maine Pyar Kiya and other small roles in various movies such as Baazigar and Bombay to Goa. He worked as an actor and comedian in the Bollywood movie Aamdani Atthanni Kharcha Rupaiya.

In 2005, ventured into stand-up comedy with the talent show The Great Indian Laughter Challenge and finished as second runner-up. Then he took part in its spin-off, The Great Indian Laughter Challenge – Champions, and won the title of "The King of Comedy". He became famous with this show. By 2009, he had done more than 2,800 live shows.

In 2009, in an interview, he said the vulgarity in comedy shows was a concern for him. He believed that comedians should practice self-regulation. Srivastav participated in Bigg Boss (Hindi season 3), the Indian counterpart of the Big Brother (franchise). After staying in the house for more than two months he was voted out on 4 December 2009. In 2010, Srivastav received threatening calls from Pakistan warning him not to crack jokes on underworld don Dawood Ibrahim and Pakistan during his shows. 

In 2013, Raju along with his wife participated in Nach Baliye season 6, which is a couples dance show on StarPlus. He has also appeared on Comedy Nights with Kapil. 

In 2016, he appeared in Mazaak Mazaak Mein, a Hindi reality television talent competition.

In 2019 participated in the comedy show Comedy Ka Maha Muqabala.

Political career
The Samajwadi Party (SP) fielded Srivastava from Kanpur Lok Sabha constituency for the 2014 Lok Sabha election. But on 11 March 2014, Srivastav returned the ticket, saying he was not getting enough support from the local units of the party. SP was expecting him to quit as the contest in the seat had become important. SP withdrew his candidature from Kanpur after he quit.

Within days of leaving SP, he joined the Bharatiya Janata Party (BJP) on 19 March 2014. BJP did not give him the ticket for Lok Sabha 2014. He campaigned in support of BJP candidates in Lok Sabha and Assembly elections. In 2014, he was appointed by the BJP led Union government as the brand ambassador of the Swachh Bharat Abhiyan and had recorded advertisements for the campaign. In 2018, Srivastav disclosed on social media that he would get the chance to contest in the 2019 Indian general election as BJP candidate for Lok Sabha, although that did not materialize. 

In March 2019, he was appointed by the BJP-led Government of Uttar Pradesh as the chairman of the Uttar Pradesh Film Development Council.

Reception
Widely described as the "king of comedy", his looks were also noted for having resembled Amitabh Bachchan.

In January 2021, Raju Srivastav released a small video clip on social media criticizing the creators and actors of the web series Tandav for allegedly hurting Hindu sentiments by insulting Hindu religion and Hindu deities. In response, filmmaker Vinod Kapri and others shared several videos of Srivastav's comedy shows where he had used Hindu deities and the Indian holy epic Ramayana in his comedy sketches. Kapri said that Srivastav had mocked Hindu god Brahma and had joked about Brahma meeting actor Madhuri Dixit and that Brahma's white beard would turn red.

Following Shrivastav's death, comedian Sunil Pal praised Shrivastav and added that "He would help juniors find gigs. He would also help his juniors financially, made sure they are paid on time and paid well. He brought in a lot of good changes in the comedy circle". Comedian Bharti Singh said that Shrivastav's death is "a great loss for the entire country".

Personal life
Srivastav married Shikha from Lucknow on 1 July 1993. They had two children, a boy and a girl.

Death
On 10 August 2022, while running on the treadmill in the gym, Raju Srivastav complained of chest pain and suffered a cardiac arrest. He underwent an angioplasty and was put on ventilator. Swelling was observed in his brain during his treatment and he was also treated by neurologists. His condition was stated to be critical ever since he suffered the heart attack. On the morning of 21 September 2022, he died during his treatment in Delhi.

The post mortem was done using the method of virtual autopsy. His last rites were conducted in Delhi.

Prolific figures including Narendra Modi, Yogi Adityanath, Rajnath Singh, Amit Shah, Ajay Devgn, Akshay Kumar, Anil Kapoor, Vivek Agnihotri, Rajpal Yadav and others expressed their condolences over Shrivastav's death.

Filmography

Films

TV series

References

External links
  

1963 births
2022 deaths
People from Kanpur
Indian male comedians
Indian stand-up comedians
Male actors in Hindi cinema
Indian male film actors
Indian male voice actors
Bigg Boss (Hindi TV series) contestants
Bharatiya Janata Party politicians from Uttar Pradesh